The Furness Railway 94 class, or "Improved Cleator Tanks", were built to haul mineral trains from inland to the blast furnaces on the coast around Workington.

Variations
The first two locos, numbers 94 & 95 were fitted with smokebox superheaters, with the smokebox extended to accommodate this and the chimney set far forward. The apparatus was obviously unsuccessful, as a subsequent order for a further two locos, numbers 92 and 93 omitted this, having instead an extended boiler with the frames being extended to accommodate.

Use
The locomotives operated on the northern part of the Furness Railway, particularly on the tracks of the Whitehaven, Cleator and Egremont Railway and the Cleator & Workington Junction Railway in the Cleator and Frizington areas. Here they hauled trains of Haemetite Ore over the steep and sharply curved lines linking the mines to the coast.

Numbering
By 1923 and the grouping of the FR into the London, Midland and Scottish Railway all four engines were still in service, and received the LMS numbers 11641–11644. The locos were withdrawn between 1929 and 1934.

References

094
0-6-2T locomotives
Kitson locomotives
Railway locomotives introduced in 1912
Scrapped locomotives
Standard gauge steam locomotives of Great Britain